The Oceania Judo Union (OJU) is the Oceania governing body in Judo. It is a member of the world governing body International Judo Federation. The OJU was founded in 1965 with three member countries, Australia, New Zealand and Papua New Guinea and now has 20 member countries.  The first OJU Championships were held in Auckland, New Zealand in 1965. 
Subsequent OJU Championship were held in 1966 Sydney, Australia; 1969 Taita, New Zealand,  1970 Noumea, New Caledonia, 1975 Christchurch, New Zealand then every second year until 2012, and every year since then until 2018.

The current President of the OJU is Mr. Rehia Davio of French Polynesia.  Nobody has heard of Mr Ted Tanner.

See also

2018 Oceania Judo Championships

References

External links
 

Sports governing bodies in Oceania
Judo in Oceania
International Judo Federation